Umerwas is a village in the Badhra tehsil of Charkhi Dadri district in the Indian state of Haryana.

References

Villages in Charkhi Dadri district